The 1997-98 Luxembourg Championship season was the second season of Luxembourg's hockey league. Four teams participated in the league, and Tornado Luxembourg won the championship.

Final ranking

External links
Season on hockeyarchives.info

Luxembourg Championship
Luxembourg Championship (ice hockey) seasons